Frida Wallberg (born April 28, 1983) is a Swedish former professional boxer who competed between 2004 and 2013. She held the WBC female super-featherweight title from 2010 to 2013.

Career

As an amateur, she won 48 of 53 matches before she turned pro in 2004. She has won the Nordic championship two times and the Swedish championship six times and, as a professional on 27 November 2010, Frida defeated the Canadian boxer Olivia Gerula for the WBC belt.

Hemorrhage

In June 2013, Wallberg was knocked out by Australian boxer Diana Prazak, suffering a cerebral hemorrhage. Wallberg was treated at Karolinska Institutet for the damage. The doctors successfully drained the blood. Over a month later she revealed in an interview that she had suffered complications from the knock out and she had no long-term plans for the future besides to rehabilitate and recover.

Professional boxing record

References

External links

 Woman Boxing Archive Network

1983 births
Sportspeople from Östergötland County
Swedish women boxers
Living people
People with traumatic brain injuries
Super-featherweight boxers
World super-featherweight boxing champions
World Boxing Council champions
AIBA Women's World Boxing Championships medalists